Speech team may refer to:

 Individual events (speech)
 Debate